Nebiler can refer to:

 Nəbilər (disambiguation)
 Nəbilər, Kalbajar, Azerbaijan
 Nəbilər, Shusha, Azerbaijan
 Nebiler, Bayramiç, Turkey
 Nebiler, Dikili, Turkey
 Nebiler, Korkuteli, Turkey
 Nebiler, Serik, Turkey

See also